Sanford Daniel Garelik (August 16, 1918 – November 19, 2011) was an American politician from New York City. Garelik also served as the first Jewish chief inspector of the New York Police Department.

Born in the Bronx, Garelik served on the New York City Council and was president of the council 1970–1973. He unsuccessfully ran for Mayor of New York City in 1973.

He was also personally thanked by Ed Sullivan at the end of the show in which the Beatles first performed in the U.S.

Garelik died in Manhattan on November 19, 2011, at the age of 93.

References

1918 births
2011 deaths
People from the Bronx
New York City Council members
New York City Police Department officers
Jewish American police officers
21st-century American Jews